Patrick D. B. Meade (born 1948), known as Bernie Meade, is an Irish former hurler. At club level he played with Passage and St Finbarr's and was also a member of the Cork senior hurling team. He usually lined out as a forward.

Career
Meade first played at juvenile and underage levels with the Passage club and had a career that spanned three decades with the club's top adult team. He transferred briefly to the St Finbarr's club and won an All-Ireland Club Championship title in 1980. He also lined out with the Seandún divisional side as both a hurler and Gaelic footballer. Meade first appeared on the inter-county scene on Cork's 1966 All-Ireland Minor Championship-winning team. He later won successive All-Ireland Under-21 Championship titles, with his scoring tally of 1–12 in the 1968 All-Ireland under-21 final remaining an all-time record. Meade was drafted onto the Cork senior hurling team during their successful 1968-69 National League campaign. He played a number of league and tournament games for Cork over the following few seasons; however, he was not selected for the championship team.

Honours
St Finbarr's
All-Ireland Senior Club Hurling Championship: 1978

Cork
National Hurling League: 1968-69
All-Ireland Under-21 Hurling Championship: 1968, 1969
Munster Under-21 Hurling Championship: 1968, 1969
All-Ireland Minor Hurling Championship: 1966
Munster Minor Hurling Championship: 1966

References

1948 births
Living people
Cork inter-county hurlers
Passage West hurlers
People from Kinsale
St Finbarr's hurlers
Seandún Gaelic footballers
Seandún hurlers
Dual players